The 1890 Army Cadets football team represented the United States Military Academy in the 1890 college football season. In the Academy's first season fielding a team in intercollegiate football, the Cadets compiled a 0–1 record.

Football began being played at the Academy in 1889, but only one inter-class match game was played that year.  During the 1890 season, the Cadets played only one game, on the West Point grounds, losing to the Navy Midshipmen by a 24 to 0 score in the inaugural Army–Navy Game. A week before the game, The New York Times reported that the planned match "is beginning to assume almost national proportions." During the game, Army's quarterback Kirby Walker was knocked out of the game four times, the last time being carried off the field and to the hospital in an unconscious state.

After the victory, Navy cadets in Annapolis "fired twenty-four great guns, and then paraded the streets with horns."

A 20-year-old Army player, Dennis Michie, was the captain of the 1890 Army football team, though he is sometimes listed as the team's head coach.  Michie was the lightest player on the team at 142 pounds. Michie was killed in 1898 during the Spanish–American War. Army's home football stadium, Michie Stadium, was dedicated in his honor when it opened in 1924.

No Army Cadets were honored on the 1890 College Football All-America Team.

Schedule

Players
The following individuals were members of Army's first intercollegiate football team in 1890.
 Butler Ames, '93, fullback
 James Bates Cavanagh, '92, substitute back
 Elmer W. Clark, '93, left guard, 205 pounds
 Joseph Thadeus Crabbe, '91, right guard
 Hanson Edward Ely, '91, substitute on rush line
 Willard E. Gleason, '92, left tackle
 John W. Heavey, '91, substitute on rush line
 Tiemann Newell Horn, '91, substitute back
 Dennis Michie, '92, captain and drop-kicks
 James T. Moore, '92, left end
 Jay Johnson Morrow, '91, substitute back
 Truman Oscar Murphy, '91, substitute on rush line
 Harry Howard Pattison, '93, substitute back
 Leonard Morton Prince, '92, right end
 Francis Henry Schoeffel, '91, right tackle
 Edward Julius Timberlake, Jr., '93, right halfback
 Kirby Walker, '92, quarterback, 145 pounds
 Frank Allen Wilcox, '92, substitute back

References

Army
Army Black Knights football seasons
College football winless seasons
Army Cadets football